The 2008 Global Champions Tour was the 3rd edition of the Global Champions Tour (GCT), an important international show jumping competition series. The 2008 Global Champions Tour was the first edition of the Global Champions Tour as official series of the FEI.

The series is held mainly in Europe, one competition and also the final are held outside of Europe. All competitions are endowed with 300000 €. All GCT events were held as CSI 5*.

The competitions was held between April 10, 2008 and September 14, 2008. The final was held in São Paulo, Brazil from  October 15, 2008 to October 19, 2008.

The champion of the Global Champions Tour Final of this year is Jessica Kürten of Ireland on Libertina.

Competitions 

All competitions are held as competition over two rounds against the clock with one jump-off against the clock.

The placement of the riders, who are not qualified for the jump-off, results of the number of penalties of both rounds and the time of the first round. Competitors who are not qualified for the second round, placed behind the riders who compete in the second round.

1st Competition: Global Champions Tour of Qatar 
April 10, 2008 to April 12, 2008 - Doha, 
Competition: Saturday, April 12, 2008 - Start: 6:00 pm, prize money: 300000 €

(Top 3 of 39 Competitors)

2nd Competition: Global Champions Tour of Germany 
April 30, 2008 to May 4, 2008 - Hamburg (German show jumping and dressage derby), 
Competition: Saturday, May 3, 2008 - Start: 2:00 pm, prize money: 300000 €

(Top 3 of 48 Competitors)

3rd Competition: Global Champions Tour of France 
June 12, 2008 to June 14, 2008 - Cannes, 
Competition: Saturday, June 14, 2008 - Start: 6:00 pm, prize money: 300000 €

(Top 3 of 49 Competitors)

4th Competition: Global Champions Tour of Monaco 
June 26, 2008 to June 28, 2008 - shore at the marina „Port Hercule“, Monte Carlo, 
Competition: Saturday, June 28, 2008 - Start: 6:00 pm, prize money: 300000 €

(Top 3 of 46 Competitors)

5th Competition: Global Champions Tour of Portugal 
July 10, 2008 to July 12, 2008 - Hipódromo Manuel Possolo, Cascais near Estoril, 
Competition: Saturday, July 12, 2008 - Start: 7:30 pm, prize money: 300000 €

(Top 3 of 46 Competitors)

6th Competition: Global Champions Tour of the Netherlands 
July 31, 2008 - August 3, 2008 - Valkenswaard, 
Competition: Saturday, August 2, 2008 - Start: 1:45 pm, prize money: 300000 €

(Top 3 of 47 Competitors)

7th Competition: Global Champions Tour of Italy 
September 11, 2008 to September 14, 2008 - Arezzo, 
Competition: Saturday, September 13, 2008 - Start: 1:00 pm, prize money: 300000 €

(Top 3 of 47 Competitors)

Global Champions Tour Final

overall standings (after 7 competitions)  

(Top 5)

Final 
October 15, 2008 to October 19, 2008 - Hipica Paulista, São Paulo (Athina Onassis International Horse Show),

First round 
Competition: Thursday, October 16, 2008 - Start: 3:30 pm, prize money: 50000 €

(Top 3 of 25 Competitors)

Final result after second round and jump-off 
Competition: Saturday, August 14, 2009 - Start: 8:00 pm, prize money: 900000 €

(Top 5 of 18 Competitors)

References 

Global Champions Tour
Global Champions Tour